Humberto Cervantes Vega (born 7 March 1944) is a Mexican lawyer and politician affiliated with the Institutional Revolutionary Party. He served as Deputy of the LIII and LIX Legislatures of the Mexican Congress representing Nuevo León. He previously served in the Congress of Nuevo León from 1976 to 1979 and as municipal president of Guadalupe from 1980 to 1982.

References

1944 births
Living people
Politicians from Zacatecas
20th-century Mexican lawyers
Members of the Congress of Nuevo León
Municipal presidents in Nuevo León
Institutional Revolutionary Party politicians
Autonomous University of Nuevo León alumni
20th-century Mexican politicians
21st-century Mexican politicians
Deputies of the LIX Legislature of Mexico
Members of the Chamber of Deputies (Mexico) for Nuevo León
21st-century Mexican lawyers